Teluk Kumbar is a town within the city of George Town in the Malaysian state of Penang. It is located within the Southwest Penang Island District, at the southern coast of Penang Island between Bayan Lepas to the east and Gertak Sanggul to the west.

Etymology 
Teluk Kumbar in Malay literally means 'kumbar bay', a reference to the salak trees (Salacca zalacca; Malay: kumbar) that grew within the area.

History

According to historians in Universiti Sains Malaysia, Teluk Kumbar was founded by two Malay pioneers - Nakhoda Seedin from Deli and Panglima Long from Setul - sometime in the late 18th century. The agricultural town was one of the handful of autonomous Malay settlements that were established at the south of Penang Island at the time.

Until the late 20th century, the town's residents depended on rice farming and fishing as the main economic activities. In the 1990s, the development of Teluk Kumbar was spearheaded by the Penang Regional Development Authority (PERDA), an agency of the Malaysian federal government which was tasked with the development of rural areas within Penang.

Demographics
According to the 2010 National Census conducted by Malaysia's Department of Statistics, Teluk Kumbar contained a population of 1,084.

Transportation 
Jalan Teluk Kumbar is the main thoroughfare within the town. It forms part of the pan-island Federal Route 6, linking Teluk Kumbar with Bayan Lepas to the east and Gertak Sanggul to the west. To alleviate worsening traffic congestion in the area, the Malaysian Public Works Department has widened a stretch of the road leading to the town in 2017.

Rapid Penang bus routes 308, 401 and 401E include stops within Teluk Kumbar. These routes connect the town with various destinations, including Penang's capital city of George Town, the Penang International Airport, Universiti Sains Malaysia, Queensbay Mall, Sungai Nibong, Bayan Lepas and Balik Pulau.

Education

Teluk Kumbar is served by four primary schools, two high schools and an Islamic religious school.

Primary schools
 SRK Seri Bayu
 SRK Sungai Batu
 SRK Telok Kumbar
 SRJK (C) Yang Cheng
High schools
 SMK Telok Kumbar
 SMK Telok Kumbar II
Islamic school
 SM Al-Itqan

References

Southwest Penang Island District
Towns in Penang